Gustavo Gutiérrez (aka Papi Gusta) was born in Mulalillo, Ecuador on September 26, 1939. He began his training when he was fifteen years old.
Gustavo is a three-time winner of the biggest race in Ecuador, Quito Ultimas Noticias (El Circuito de los Barrios) in 1963, 1967, and again in 1968.
In 1967 he was named athlete of the year in Ecuador.
He was the first Ecuadorian athlete to qualify for the Olympics. In 1968 he represented Ecuador in the 1968 Summer Olympics, in Mexico City, competing in the marathon. See official results at, Athletics at the 1968 Summer Olympics – Men's marathon.

In 1969 he broke the South American record for the half marathon completing it in one hour, eight minutes, and fifteen seconds.
Twenty years after his third victory in the Quito Ultimas Noticias his daughter Pilar Gutierrez and grandson Iver Paredes ran in the 2008 Quito Ultimas Noticias. Papi Gusta ran the final five kilometers alongside his daughter.

Achievements

References

Sports Reference

1939 births
Living people
Olympic athletes of Ecuador
Athletes (track and field) at the 1968 Summer Olympics
Ecuadorian male long-distance runners
Ecuadorian male marathon runners